Saints Severinus, Exuperius, and Felician were martyrs put to death under Emperor Marcus Aurelius at Vienne, Gaul.

References

Gallo-Roman saints
2nd-century Christian martyrs
170 deaths
Year of birth unknown
Groups of Christian martyrs of the Roman era